Adam Stanisław Kaczmarek (born 17 October 1961 in Bydgoszcz) is a Polish former sport shooter who competed in the 1988 Summer Olympics and in the 1992 Summer Olympics.

References

1961 births
Living people
Polish male sport shooters
ISSF pistol shooters
Olympic shooters of Poland
Shooters at the 1988 Summer Olympics
Shooters at the 1992 Summer Olympics
Sportspeople from Bydgoszcz
20th-century Polish people
21st-century Polish people